The 2006 Oregon State Beavers football team represented Oregon State University in the 2006 NCAA Division I FBS football season. The team's head coach was Mike Riley, with home games being played at Reser Stadium in Corvallis, Oregon.

The upset
After a mediocre 4–3 start, the Beavers had a historic 33-31 upset win over #3 (AP, #2 coaches) University of Southern California that snapped the Trojans' 38-game regular season winning streak and 27 game Pac-10 winning streak.  From plays in this upset win, the Beavers won the Pontiac game changing performance award for the week in the PAC-10 and nationally after Jeff Van Orsow batted down a two-point conversion attempt, which stopped any hope of bringing the game to overtime.

110th Civil War
The 110th Civil War was a thriller played at Reser Stadium. After scoring first, the Ducks failed to gain the lead until the 4th quarter. With 3:07 left to play and the Beavers up 27–20, the Ducks scored a touchdown and successfully made the 2-point conversion, sparking celebrations on the Oregon sideline as the Ducks went up 28–27. With 1:12 left in the game, OSU's kicker Alexis Serna kicked a clutch 40-yard field goal, that ended up being the game winner. Alexis Serna was pivotal in the Beaver victory, as he connected on field goals from 49, 40, and 50 yards. OSU defensive lineman Ben Siegert, who earlier in the game blocked a point-after attempt by the Ducks, blocked a 44-yard field goal attempt by Oregon's Matt Evensen with 20 seconds left to play. The Beavers won the Civil War 30–28.

Sun Bowl
The 2006 Sun Bowl, in El Paso, Texas, and against the Missouri Tigers, was another thrilling and close game for the Beavers this season. After being down 14 points in the 4th quarter, the Beavers proceeded to score 7 in a drive that took about 3 and a half minutes. They next held the Tigers, and got the ball back, now only being down 7. With less than 2 minutes, and the ball, the Beavers proceed again to score. Coach Riley elected to go for a two-point conversion instead of kicking the extra point. The extra point would have been enough to tie the game and send it to overtime.  The two-point conversion was successful, giving the Beavers a one-point lead with only 22 seconds left in the game, and the eventual win.  The game was voted among the top three bowl games of the year by ESPN and Fox Sports.

Schedule

Roster

Regular season

Eastern Washington

Boise State

Idaho

California

Washington State

Washington

Arizona

USC

    
    
    
    
    
    
    
    
    
    
    
    

Oregon State's first victory over USC since 2000.

Arizona State

UCLA

Stanford

Oregon

Hawaii

Brut Sun Bowl vs. Missouri

References

Oregon State
Oregon State Beavers football seasons
Sun Bowl champion seasons
Oregon State Beavers football